The National Museum of Fine Arts, formerly known as the National Art Gallery, is an art museum in Manila, Philippines. It is located on Padre Burgos Avenue across from the National Museum of Anthropology in the eastern side of Rizal Park. The museum, owned and operated by the National Museum of the Philippines, was founded in 1998 and houses a collection of paintings and sculptures by classical Filipino artists such as Juan Luna, Félix Resurrección Hidalgo and Guillermo Tolentino.

The neoclassical building was built in 1921 and originally served to house the various legislative bodies of the Philippine government. Known as the Old Legislative Building (also the Old Congress Building), it was the home of the bicameral congress from 1926 to 1972, and the Philippine Senate from 1987 to 1997.

History

The building was originally designed by the Bureau of Public Works (precursor of the Department of Public Works and Highways) Consulting Architect Ralph Harrington Doane and Antonio Toledo in 1918, and was intended to be the future home of the National Library of the Philippines, according to the Plan of Manila of Daniel H. Burnham. Meanwhile, a Capitol building for the Philippine Legislature (established on October 16, 1916) was to rise on Wallace Field, just south of the library (the location is now María Y. Orosa Street in Rizal Park). Instead, the Philippine Legislature decided to move into the Library building in 1926, and changes to the building's layout were done accordingly by architect Juan M. Arellano. It was built under the supervision of the architecture firm of Pedro Siochi and Company and the building therefore became known as the Legislative Building. The Second Regular Session of the 7th Philippine Legislature was formally opened on the inauguration of the building on July 16, 1926 in the presence of Governor-General Leonard Wood, then Senate President Manuel L. Quezon, House Speaker Manuel Roxas, and Colonel Carmi A. Thompson, envoy of President Calvin Coolidge of the United States. It was concurrently the headquarters of the National Library from 1928 to 1944.

In 1935, the Commonwealth of the Philippines was proclaimed, and the inauguration of President Manuel L. Quezon were held outside the building. The building became home of the National Assembly of the Philippines, and it was subsequently known as the National Assembly Building. In 1940, the National Assembly was replaced by a bicameral Congress of the Philippines, consisting of a Senate and House of Representatives. The Senate occupied the upper floors while the House occupied the lower floors. The building would serve as home of the Commonwealth Congress until 1945.

In World War II, Japanese forces in Manila bombed and destroyed the building in February 1945. Most of the structure was beyond repair, except for the still-standing central portion. With the inauguration of the Republic of the Philippines in 1946, the building was reconstructed to be the home of Congress. It was rebuilt by the U.S. Philippine War Damage Corporation to the same dimensions but with less interior and exterior ornamentation. Reconstruction began in 1949, while the Congress moved back the same year. The two wings of the building were completed in 1950. The building was rebuilt mostly from memory, with the aid of a few remaining blueprints.

The building became known as the Congress Building, and continuously served as home of the Congress of the Philippines until 1972 with the declaration of martial law. The Congress was effectively dissolved, and the building was padlocked. For a short time, the building became home of the offices of the Prime Minister of the Philippines, a position established under the 1973 Constitution of the Philippines, on the fourth floor, the Ombudsman on the third floor, the National Museum on the second floor, and the Sandiganbayan on the ground floor. The building was called the Executive House for the duration of that time.

The Congress of the Philippines was reestablished with the ratification of the 1987 Constitution of the Philippines. While the House of Representatives moved to the Batasang Pambansa Complex in Constitution Hill, Quezon City, the Senate used the original Congress Building for their plenary sessions.

The Senate would use the Congress Building until May 1997, when it moved to the Government Service Insurance System Building on reclaimed land on Manila Bay in Pasay. The former office of the Prime Minister was taken as the Office of the Vice President.

The building was then turned over to the National Museum of the Philippines in 1998.

On September 30, 2010, the National Historical Commission of the Philippines declared the building as a "National Historical Landmark" by virtue of Resolution No. 8 (dated September 30, 2010). A marker commemorating the declaration was unveiled on October 29, 2010.

The collection
The museum contains a number of important works, including:

See also
 List of national galleries

References

External links

Arkitekturang Filipino - www.arkitektura.ph - National Museum of the Philippines Building (Old Congress Building)
History of the Senate of the Philippines
History of the House of Representatives of the Philippines - Former Buildings
NHCP declares Old Legislative Building as National Historical Landmark

National Museum of the Philippines
Buildings and structures in Ermita
Museums in Manila
Cultural Properties of the Philippines in Metro Manila
National Historical Landmarks of the Philippines
Neoclassical architecture in the Philippines
Juan M. Arellano buildings
Asian art museums
Philippines